The 2021 St. Louis mayoral election occurred in two stages, with a unified primary on March 2, 2021, and a two-candidate general election on April 6, 2021. Incumbent Democratic mayor Lyda Krewson was eligible to seek re-election to a second term in office, but chose to retire.

In a primary field of four candidates, St. Louis Treasurer Tishaura Jones and Alderwoman Cara Spencer advanced to the general election. Jones defeated Spencer in the general election by nearly 4% of votes cast, becoming the first African-American woman elected to the office of mayor.

Background 
In 2017, then-St. Louis alderwoman Lyda Krewson was elected mayor, becoming the first woman to do so. However, in late 2020, she announced that she would not seek re-election to a second term, despite being eligible to run. Krewson cited her age as the primary reason for her retirement, saying: "I am now pushing 70. So after a lot of thinking and a lot of discussion with my family, I decided to retire in April and not run for re-election." Krewson had faced criticism during her term for her perceived mishandling of Black Lives Matter protests in the summer of 2020, with numerous demonstrations outside the mayor's home and calls for her to resign. Krewson was also facing a primary challenge from Jones and Spencer, both of whom launched their campaigns for mayor before Krewson announced her retirement. However, Krewson denied that these factors had any influence on her decision not to seek re-election.

Some also speculated that Proposition D, a ballot measure passed by St. Louis voters with 68% of the vote in November 2020, would have made it more difficult for Krewson to survive a primary challenge. Proposition D altered St. Louis elections so that they would use a new electoral process. The old system used partisan primaries with first-past-the-post voting. Since 2021, all candidates for municipal elections in St. Louis instead compete in a single nonpartisan primary using approval voting, and the two candidates with the highest vote total advanced to the general election. Krewson opposed Proposition D, while Jones supported it.

Candidates

Candidates who advanced to the general election

Candidates eliminated in the primary

Disqualified
Keith Jefferson, small business owner
Lassaad Jeliti, restaurateur
Dana Kelly, restaurateur (Party preference: Democratic)

Declined
Gregory F. X. Daly,  St. Louis Collector of Revenue (Party preference: Democratic)
Lyda Krewson, incumbent mayor (2017–present) (Party preference: Democratic)

Primary election
In a primary field of four candidates, St. Louis Treasurer Tishaura Jones and Alderwoman Cara Spencer advanced to the general election. The two women defeated President of the St. Louis Board of Aldermen Lewis E. Reed as well as utility manager Andrew Jones.

Endorsements

Polling

Results

Tishaura Jones and Cara Spencer advanced to the general election. Because the primary election was conducted using approval voting (and voters had the opportunity to mark their approval of more than one candidate), the numbers in the "Approval percentage" row add up to more than 100 percent.

General election 
At the general election on the evening of Tuesday, April 6, 2021, Tishaura Jones defeated Cara Spencer to earn her first term as mayor of St. Louis, winning by over two-thousand votes. This constituted nearly 4% of the people that voted that evening.

Polling 
Leading up to the early April election, over 20% of voters told pollsters that they were undecided.

Results 
Tishaura Jones defeated Cara Spencer by a 4% margin. Jones' margin of victory largely came from Northern St. Louis, while Spencer was stronger in the south. Jones received her largest margins in wards where Lewis Reed had come second in the primary.

Notes

Partisan clients

References

2021 Missouri elections
St. Louis
April 2021 events in the United States
Mayoral elections in St. Louis
Non-partisan elections